Marina Kolonina ( born February 3, 1970, in Moscow) is a Russian modern pentathlete.

References 
 

1970 births
Living people
Russian female modern pentathletes
World Modern Pentathlon Championships medalists
20th-century Russian women